The Ministry of Justice and Public Administration of the Republic of Croatia is the ministry in the Government of Croatia which is in charge of prosecuting government cases and the administration of institutions falling within the scope of the judiciary system (courts, prisons, etc.), and in charge of the system and organization of state administration and local and regional governments, political and electoral system, personal status of citizens and other activities within its jurisdiction.

List of ministers

Ministers of Justice (1990–2020)

Ministers of Justice and Public Administration (2020–present)

See also

 Justice ministry
 Politics of Croatia

References

External links 
 
Papers on corruption in Croatian Judiciary, ed. Darko Petričić MA, Zagreb, 2016., p. 60.-86 

Justice
Croatia
Croatia, Justice
1990 establishments in Croatia